The Skiffle Sessions – Live in Belfast is a live album by Northern Irish singer-songwriter Van Morrison, with Lonnie Donegan and Chris Barber, released in 2000. Lonnie Donegan had played with the Chris Barber jazz band when he had his first hit with "Rock Island Line"/"John Henry"  in 1955. He had been a childhood influence on Van Morrison, who had performed in his own skiffle band with schoolmates when he was twelve years old in Belfast, Northern Ireland. This was Donegan's second album in twenty years, reviving his career until his death in 2002.

Recording history
Recorded on 20 and 21 November 1998 at Whitla Hall, Belfast, Northern Ireland.  In 1977, Morrison had discussed recording an album of skiffle music with Dr. John, "because I started off in a skiffle group and there must be millions of other musicians who also began their careers playing that kind of music..."  In preparation for this recording, he went to see Donegan perform and invited him to dinner and after a second meeting they arranged to record the sessions live. Dr. John, who was playing in concert in the city's Ulster Hall the same evening, arrived toward the end of the recording to play piano on the final few tracks.

Track listing
All songs traditional except as indicated.
"It Takes a Worried Man" – 3:40
"Lost John" – 3:33
"Goin' Home" (Antonín Dvořák) – 3:08
"Good Morning Blues"  (Lead Belly, John Lomax) – 2:52
"Outskirts of Town" (Andy Razaf, Fats Waller) – 4:20
"Don't You Rock Me Daddy-O" – 1:51
"Alabamy Bound" (Buddy DeSylva, Bud Green, Ray Henderson) – 2:22
"Midnight Special" – 2:53
"Dead or Alive" (Woody Guthrie) – 2:33
"Frankie and Johnny" – 4:31
"Goodnight Irene" (Lead Belly, Lomax) – 2:46
"Railroad Bill" – 1:57
"Muleskinner Blues" (Jimmie Rodgers, George Vaughn) – 3:06
"The Ballad of Jesse James" – 3:07
"I Wanna Go Home" – 3:46

Personnel
Van Morrison – vocal, acoustic guitar
Lonnie Donegan – vocal, acoustic guitar
Chris Barber – vocal, trombone, double bass
Paul Henry, Big Jim Sullivan – acoustic guitar
Nick Payne – harmonica, saxophone, background vocal
Dr. John – piano
Nicky Scott – electric bass
Alan "Sticky" Wicket – washboard, percussion
Chris Hunt - drums

Charts

Notes

References
 Heylin, Clinton (2003). Can You Feel the Silence? Van Morrison: A New Biography, Chicago Review Press 

Albums produced by Van Morrison
Van Morrison live albums
2000 live albums